North Wheeling Historic District is a national historic district located at Wheeling, Ohio County, West Virginia. The district encompasses 134 contributing buildings and one contributing object in a 2 1/2-block section of northern Wheeling, known as "Old Town".  Most of the district consists of mid- to late-19th-century residential buildings.  A number of popular architectural styles are represented, including Greek Revival, Italianate, and Late Victorian. Notable buildings include the Vigilant Engine House (c. 1891), William Goering House (1885), Alfred Paull House (1880s), Williams Duplex Tenement (1880–1884), George W. Eckhart House (1891–1892), Christian Hess House (1876), Edward Hazlett House (1893), Henry K. List House (1858).  The object is the Pollack Memorial Monument (1916).

It was listed on the National Register of Historic Places in 1988, with boundary increases in 2008 and 2022.

References

External links
All of the following are located in Wheeling, Ohio County, WV:

Historic districts in Wheeling, West Virginia
Greek Revival architecture in West Virginia
Italianate architecture in West Virginia
National Register of Historic Places in Wheeling, West Virginia
Victorian architecture in West Virginia
Historic districts on the National Register of Historic Places in West Virginia